Michał Życzkowski (12 April 1930 – 24 May 2006) was a Polish mechanical engineer.

Career
Życzkowski was born in Kraków. In 1954 he graduated at the Tadeusz Kościuszko University of Technology, and in 1958 he received a diploma at the Imperial College London. He became Professor and doctor honoris causa of the Cracow University of Technology, full member of Polish Academy of Sciences and Polish Academy of Learning, Foreign Corresponding Member of the Austrian Academy of Sciences.

He was the youngest professor in the history of Poland during his time. He became professor at the age of 31. 
He advised 29 Ph.D. students, 11 of them were promoted to professors.

He had four children, among them Karol Życzkowski. He died in his home city of Krakow.

Editor
Member of Editorial Boards of: 
International Journal of Mechanical Sciences
Structural Optimization
Journal of Theoretical and Applied Mechanics
Zeitschrift für Angewandte Mathematik und Mechanik.

Works
 Sprężystość i plastyczność (with Wiesław Krzyś), Wydawnictwo Naukowe PWN Warsaw, 1962
 Obciążenia złożone w teorii plastyczności, Wydawnictwo Naukowe PWN Warsaw, 1973
 Combined loadings in the theory of plasticity, Wydawnictwo Naukowe PWN Warsaw, 1981
 294 scientific publications

References

External links
Pro Memoria web page of Prof.Michał Życzkowski

1930 births
2006 deaths
Polish scientists
Members of the Polish Academy of Sciences
Tadeusz Kościuszko University of Technology alumni